André Filipe Castanheira Ceitil (born 11 March 1995) is a Portuguese professional footballer who plays for U.D. Vilafranquense as a defensive midfielder or defender.

Club career

Portugal
Born in Almada, Setúbal District, Ceitil spent his first four years as a senior in the lower leagues, representing in the process C.D. Cova da Piedade, S.U. Sintrense and S.C. Farense. On 12 July 2018 he signed a three-year deal with Leixões S.C. of the LigaPro, making his debut in the competition on 26 August in a 2–1 away win against G.D. Estoril Praia where he played the full 90 minutes.

In the summer of 2019, Ceitil terminated his contract at the Estádio do Mar.

Universitatea Cluj
On 7 July 2019, Ceitil joined Romanian club FC Universitatea Cluj for two seasons. His maiden appearance in Liga II took place on 11 August, when he started and finished the 3–0 home victory over ACS Viitorul Târgu Jiu.

Vilafranquense
Ceitil returned to both Portugal and its second division during the 2020 January transfer window, joining newly promoted U.D. Vilafranquense on a one-and-a-half-year contract. He appeared in six matches until the end of the campaign– curtailed because of the COVID-19 pandemic and with no relegations due to Vitória F.C. and C.D. Aves' serious financial problems which led to their exclusion from the Primeira Liga.

References

External links

1995 births
Living people
Sportspeople from Almada
Portuguese footballers
Association football defenders
Association football midfielders
Association football utility players
Liga Portugal 2 players
Campeonato de Portugal (league) players
C.D. Cova da Piedade players
S.U. Sintrense players
S.C. Farense players
Leixões S.C. players
U.D. Vilafranquense players
Liga II players
FC Universitatea Cluj players
Portuguese expatriate footballers
Expatriate footballers in Romania
Portuguese expatriate sportspeople in Romania